Wellington is a neighborhood in southwestern Lexington, Kentucky, United States. Its boundaries are Wellington Way to the north and east, Keithshire Way to the south, and Clays Mill Road to the west.

Neighborhood statistics
Wellington was not developed until 2002, so there were no statistics compiled on it during the 2000 census.

External links

Neighborhoods in Lexington, Kentucky